Domo del Mar is a 4,000-seat indoor arena located in Ciudad del Carmen, Campeche, used primarily for concerts, sporting events, lucha libre, graduation ceremonies and other special events.  It has been a popular venue for boxing, having hosted numerous matches, some of which have been televised.  It has hosted concerts from stars like Alejandra Guzman, RBD, Paulina Rubio, Joan Sebastian, Los Tigres del Norte and Mana

A 26,000-seat soccer stadium, Estadio del Mar, is being built adjacent to the Domo del Mar.

References

Music venues in Mexico
Boxing venues in Mexico